Emslie Horniman's Pleasance is a park in Kensal Town, in the Borough of Kensington and Chelsea, London. It is named after Emslie John Horniman the MP for Chelsea (of which Kensal Town was then an exclave) who created it. It opened in 1914. The park is the traditional starting point for the Notting Hill Carnival.

The Pleasance contains a notable walled garden in the Arts and Crafts style, designed for Horniman by C.F.A. Voysey and Madeline Agar. Voysey's walls and shelters are Grade II listed on the National Heritage List for England.

It is located on Bosworth Road, Kensal Town, on the southern side of the Grand Union Canal, near to Notting Hill. The nearest tube station is Westbourne Park.

The park also contains tennis courts, five-a-side football pitches, a hard play area and a children's playground.

References

See also 
 Trellick Tower

1914 establishments in England
Arts and Crafts architecture in England
Buildings by C.F.A. Voysey
Gardens in London
Grade II listed buildings in the Royal Borough of Kensington and Chelsea
Parks and open spaces in the Royal Borough of Kensington and Chelsea